Chakula is a mountain peak located at  above sea level in the far west of the Transhimalaya.

Location 
The peak is located between Chumathang and Chushul villages in the Leh district of Union territory of Ladakh (India).

References 

Mountains of the Transhimalayas
Six-thousanders of the Transhimalayas
Mountains of Ladakh